was the 8th Japanese Daimyō of the Sakai clan, Himeji Domain and the last Tairō (Chief Minister) of the Tokugawa Shogunate,.
He was appointed Tairō on 26 February 1865 after the assassination of Ii Naosuke, until his dismissal on 29 December 1865. A staunch supporter of the reforming of the Bakufu government and punitive actions towards the Chōshū Domain rebels, he tried to accelerate the Westernization of the Japanese military and purged Imperialists during his short term.

References

Fudai daimyo
Sakai clan
People of Edo-period Japan
1827 births
1895 deaths